The Death Canyon Trail is a  long hiking trail in Grand Teton National Park in the U.S. state of Wyoming.

Route 
The trail begins west of the White Grass Ranger Station Historic District and ends at Fox Creek Pass where it intercepts the Teton Crest Trail. The trail follows the length of Death Canyon. To get to the trail, the Valley Trail must be accessed at the White Grass Grass Ranger Station then by trending westward just to the north of Phelps Lake. Near Phelps Lake Overlook, the Death Canyon Trail heads west and is flanked by Albright Peak to the north and Prospectors Mountain to the south. The Death Canyon Trail continues west then southwest, climbing steadily to Fox Creek Pass.

See also
List of hiking trails in Grand Teton National Park

References

Hiking trails of Grand Teton National Park